Phélypeaux is the name of a French family from Blésois region (around Blois). Its two principal branches were those of the lords of Herbault, La Vrillière, and Saint Florentin, and of the counts of Pontchartrain and Maurepas.  The family produced a number of individuals who played an important role in royal administration during the Ancien Régime.

Pontchartrain-Maurepas branch
 Paul Phélypeaux (1569–1621), founder of the branch of Pontchartrain-Maurepas, brother of Raimond Phélypeaux (see below); he became secretary of state in 1610.  Secretary of State for Protestant Affairs
 Louis I Phélypeaux de Pontchartrain, son of previous
 Louis II Phélypeaux (1643–1727), son of previous, marquis de Phélypeaux (1667), comte de Maurepas (1687), comte de Pontchartrain (1699), known as the chancellor de Pontchartrain, was a French politician.  Secretary of State of the Navy (France), Secretary of State of the Maison du Roi, Controller-General of Finances, Chancellor of France.
 Jérôme Phélypeaux (1674–1747), comte de Pontchartrain, son of previous. Secretary of State of the Navy (France), Secretary of State of the Maison du Roi
 Jean-Frédéric Phélypeaux, comte de Maurepas (1701–1781), son of previous. Secretary of State of the Maison du Roi

La Vrillière branch
Raymond Phélypeaux, seigneur of Herbault and La Vrilliere (d. 1629), was treasurer of the Épargne in 1599, and became minister of state in 1621, and Secretary of State for Foreign Affairs (France).
Louis Phélypeaux (1598–1681), son of the previous; minister of state, and Secretary of State for Protestant Affairs.
Balthazar Phélypeaux, marquis de Chateauneuf (1638–1700), son of the previous; minister of state and Secretary of State for Protestant Affairs.
Louis Phélypeaux, marquis de La Vrilliere (1672–1725), son of the previous; minister of state and Secretary of State for Protestant Affairs.
Louis Phelypeaux (1705–1777), son of the previous, count of Saint Florentin and afterwards duke of La Vrilliere (1770), succeeded his father as secretary of state. Secretary of State for Protestant Affairs, Secretary of State of the Maison du Roi.
Raimond Balthazar Phélypeaux, seigneur du Verger, a member of the La Vrilliere branch, was sent as ambassador to Savoy in 1700, where he discovered the intrigues of the duke of Savoy, Victor Amadeus II of Savoy, against France; and when war was declared he was kept a close prisoner by the duke (1703–1704). At the time of his death (1713) he was governor-general in the West Indies.

References

See also
 Ancien Régime in France
 Secretary of State of the Maison du Roi
 Secretary of State for Foreign Affairs (France)
 Secretary of State for War (France)
 Secretary of State of the Navy (France)
 Secretary of State for Protestant Affairs

French noble families